Ferenc Sidó (18 April 1923 in Pata – 6 February 1998 in Budapest) was an ethnic Hungarian international table tennis player from Slovakia.

Table tennis career
From 1947 to 1961 he won 26 medals in singles, doubles, and team events in the World Table Tennis Championships

The 26 medals included nine gold medals; one in the men's singles, two in the men's doubles with József Kóczián and Ferenc Soos, two in the men's team event and four in the mixed doubles with Gizi Farkas and Angelica Rozeanu.

He also won four English Open titles.

See also
 List of table tennis players
 List of World Table Tennis Championships medalists

References

Czechoslovak male table tennis players
1923 births
1998 deaths